BMW X may refer to the following BMW crossovers, SAVs, and SACs:
BMW X1 (SUV based on 1 Series platform)
BMW X2 (SUV with coupé roofline, based on X1 platform)
BMW X3 (SUV based on 3 Series platform)
BMW X4 (SUV with coupé roofline, based on X3 platform)
BMW X5 (SUV based on 5 Series platform)
BMW X6 (SUV with coupé roofline, based on X5 platform)
BMW X7 (SUV based on 7 Series platform)
BMW XM (SUV with coupé roofline, based on X7 platform)
BMW iX (electric SUV built on a dedicated platform)

Gallery

X